Robert Laird Harris (March 10, 1911 – April 25, 2008) was a Presbyterian minister, church leader, and Old Testament scholar.

Biography
Harris was born near Upper Makefield Township, Pennsylvania. He earned a B.S. from the University of Delaware (1931), a Th.B. (1935) and a Th.M. (1937) from Westminster Theological Seminary, an A.M. from University of Pennsylvania (1941), and a Ph.D. from Dropsie College (1947).

He was licensed as a minister in the Presbyterian Church (USA) in 1935, joined the newly formed Orthodox Presbyterian Church in 1936, then teamed up with those forming the Bible Presbyterian Church in 1937. In 1956, he became  moderator of a new offshoot denomination, the Bible Presbyterian Synod (BPS), later to become the Evangelical Presbyterian Church. He was involved on the committee that brought about the merger of the EPC with another denomination to become the Reformed Presbyterian Church, Evangelical Synod (RPCES) in 1965, and then the RPCES, along with its education institutions Covenant College and Covenant Theological Seminary, became part of the Presbyterian Church in America in 1982, at which time Harris was elected moderator of the 10th General Assembly of that body.

He was part-time instructor in Hebrew at the University of Pennsylvania (1946–1947) and then taught for twenty years at Faith Theological Seminary (1937–1956). He resigned from that institution because of his belief in the propriety of denomination-controlled institutions, and he then helped found the Covenant Theological Seminary, which was a denominational institution and where he was chairman of the Old Testament department until he retired in 1981. Harris served as Professor of Old Testament (and later adjunct professor) at Knox Theological Seminary at its founding in 1989. He was actively involved with the development of the Old Testament department there, teaching Hebrew, Hebrew Exegesis, the Pentateuch, and Survey through 1993.

Harris's first wife, Elizabeth K. Nelson, was born on April 30, 1910 and died in 1980. He then married Anne P. Krauss and lived in Quarryville, Pennsylvania.

Publications
Harris published several books including Introductory Hebrew Grammar, Inspiration and Canonicity of the Bible, Your Bible, and Man—God's Eternal Creation

He also served as editor of The Theological Wordbook of the Old Testament and was a contributing editor to the Zondervan Pictorial Encyclopedia of the Bible. He was contributed articles to the Wycliffe Bible Commentary and the Expositor's Bible, and he served as chairman of the Committee on Bible Translation for the New International Version.

Works

Books
 - in 5 volumes

 - in 2 volumes

Chapters

Articles

References

 R. Laird Harris Papers from the PCA Historical Center

Social Security record of Elizabeth K.(Nelson) Harris for birthdate.

1911 births
2008 deaths
University of Delaware alumni
Westminster Theological Seminary alumni
Dropsie College alumni
American Calvinist and Reformed theologians
Orthodox Presbyterian Church ministers
Westminster Theological Seminary faculty
American biblical scholars
Old Testament scholars
American Christian Young Earth creationists
People from Bucks County, Pennsylvania
Presbyterian Church (USA) teaching elders
Presbyterian Church in America ministers
20th-century American clergy